Fernando de Alencastre Noroña y Silva, 1st Duke of Linares, GE (April 15, 1662 in Madrid, Spain – June 3, 1717 in Mexico City) was a Spanish nobleman and military officer. He also served as Viceroy of New Spain (colonial México), from January 15, 1711 to August 15, 1716.

Early career
Alencastre Noroña y Silva was a descendant of Fernando de Noroña, Duke of Linares, and thus from a distinguished Spanish family with origins in the Portuguese nobility. In addition to the two titles he inherited, he was knight commander of the Order of Santiago, lord of the bedchamber of the king, and lieutenant general in the army. He was also knight commander of the royal arms in the Kingdom of Naples, honorary viceroy of Sardinia, and vicar general of La Toscana.

Alencastre was an early donor to the Jesuit missions in Baja California, providing 5,000 reales as seed money in 1697.

Viceroy of New Spain
In 1711 Fernando de Alencastre became the colonial viceroy and captain general of the Viceroyalty of New Spain, and president of the Audiencia Real.

On August 16, 1711 there was a strong earthquake that damaged many buildings and resulted in significant loss of life. The earthquake was said to last half an hour. The viceroy is said to have paid from his own funds to help the poor and to restore some of the buildings.

In 1713, Mexico City experienced a snowfall unlike any earlier recorded. The harvest failed, and a severe famine resulted. The streets were filled with people begging for bread. Perhaps as a result of the famine, a severe plague broke out, continuing into the following year. Many sick people were abandoned on the streets. Many people died and were buried in common graves. Both the viceroy and the archbishop of Mexico, José Lanziego, reportedly paid from their own funds to help the poor during these catastrophes.

Alencastre ordered the construction of four well-armed, light warships at Coatzacoalcos to reinforce the Armada de Barlovento (coast guard). He bought 600 new muskets in Cantabria for the militia, and sent money for the repair of fortifications at Cumaná.

Spanish shipping trade
Around 1711 Alencastre authored a proposal to the Council of the Indies (Consejo de Indias) in Spain to legitimize private trade between the Viceroyalty of New Spain and the Viceroyalty of Peru between their Pacific Ocean ports.  Spain had supplied Peru by bringing goods by government fleet to the Atlantic port of Portobelo in Panama, from whence they were carted to Lima overland. There was no direct trade allowed between the Spanish colonies.

However, the Spanish government fleet did not arrive for eleven years between 1696 and 1707, nor between 1708 and 1711.  The problem was caused the War of the Spanish Succession, making it difficult for the Spanish fleet to cross the Atlantic.  In their place, the French were sailing from Saint Malo in France, around South America's Cape Horn, to the seaport of Callao in Peru. At Callao, the French sold European merchandise for Peruvian silver, and then sailed to Asia trading the silver for Asian products (spices and especially textiles), and then returning to Callao to sell the Asian goods for silver and/or cacao, and then returning to France.

Viceroy Alencastre suggested that Spain permit private Spanish merchant ships to sail between the Pacific ports of Acapulco and Callao.  In Acapulco, they could pick up Asian goods shipped on the Spanish government's Manila galleons, and they could also purchase European goods shipped on the Spanish government's Atlantic fleet to Veracruz and brought across Mexico. Alencastre pointed out that banning Spanish merchants in the Americas from trading between Acapulco (New Spain) and Callao (Peru) was simply making French merchants wealthy.

The Council of the Indies rejected the idea, hinting that Viceroy Alencastre himself might be profiting from Pacific trade: 
"without the toleration of the Viceroys, governors, and ministers of those Kingdoms [New Spain and Peru], the perpetrators of fraud could not continue business with their goods with the freedom and openness with which they have done so in recent years."

Foreign affairs

Spanish involvement in the transatlantic slave trade, which involved transporting enslaved Africans to New Spain, had been authorized by the Spanish Crown since 1501. As part of the terms of the Treaty of Utrecht, the Spanish Crown granted the Asiento de Negros, a monopoly contract granting the recipient the right to sell African slaves in Spanish America, to the South Sea Company for 30 years. This contract had the unintended effect of allowing British merchants to trade large quantities of unauthorized goods and merchandise directly with the Spanish colonies as well. The longstanding British settlement at Laguna de Términos was another issue, which continued to illegally harvest tropical woods, especially logwood trees, which were then exported to Europe.

Internal affairs and new settlements
The pueblo of San Felipe de Linares was founded by Sebastián Villegas Cumplido in September 1711, and named in honor of the Viceroy. It is located in present-day state of Nuevo León.

The viceroy authorized expeditions in 1716 and in 1718, to reoccupy the Spanish Texas territory after its abandonment in 1690, and establish missions and a settlement there. The pueblo of San Antonio was founded in 1718. He also authorized establishing missions in Nuevo Mexico, present day New Mexico. The indigenous and sophisticated Pueblo peoples continued in revolt against the occupation of their homeland, taken by the Spanish in 1598 as the Province of Santa Fe de Nuevo México.

In 1711 Father Eusebio Kino, renowned explorer and missionary in Sonora, Baja California and Alta California, died in Magdelena, Sonora.

Alencastre constructed the aqueduct of Arcos de Belén to Salto de Agua in Mexico City. He continued and expanded La , a special tribunal dedicated to fighting robbery in the cities and on the highways. He prohibited the manufacture of the alcoholic beverage aguardiente from sugar cane, and made attempts to suppress immorality among the regular clergy.

The Crown fixed the annual contribution of New Spain to the mother country at one million pesos. To raise this money required some ingenuity on the part of the viceroy.

On October 28, 1715 an insurrection broke out among the garrison at San Juan de Ulúa, near Veracruz. For two years the soldiers had received only partial pay. The rebels were tried, convicted, and pardoned. Afterwards they continued to press their grievances.

Alencastre founded the first public library and the first natural history museum in New Spain. King Philip V of Spain directed that the museum send to Spain samples of rocks, plants, fruits, animals and other things found in Mexico but unknown in Spain. The viceroy complied, copiously.

Retirement and death
In 1716 he turned over the office to his successor, Baltasar de Zúñiga, 1st Duke of Arión. He left for Zúñiga a written Instrucción, in which he detailed the sad social and economic conditions of the colony.

He died the following year in Mexico City, and was interred in the church of the Discalced Carmelites.  He left many charitable donations in his will, including an addition 5,000 for the Jesuit missions of Baja California.

References

 "Alencastre Noroña y Silva, Fernando de," Enciclopedia de México, v. 1. Mexico City, 1988.
 García Puron, Manuel, México y sus gobernantes, v. 1. Mexico City: Joaquín Porrua, 1984.
 Orozco L., Fernando, Fechas Históricas de México. Mexico City: Panorama Editorial, 1988, .
 Orozco Linares, Fernando, Gobernantes de México. Mexico City: Panorama Editorial, 1985, .
 Alegre, Francisco Javier. Historia de la Provincia de la Compan~ía de Jesus de Nueva Espan~a.  Nueva edición por Ernest J. Burrus y Felix Zubillaga. Roma: Insitutum Historicum S.J. [1766], 1960.

External links 

Viceroys of New Spain
Spanish generals
1640s births
1717 deaths
18th-century Mexican people
Dukes of Spain
Marquesses of Spain
Knights of Santiago
1710s in Mexico
1710s in New Spain